List of ships present at the International Fleet Review, Portsmouth, July 2005.  None of the photographs were taken at the Review unless otherwise noted.

Navy representatives

Royal Navy

Aircraft carriers
HMS Invincible
HMS Illustrious

Amphibious landing ships
HMS Ocean
HMS Albion
HMS Bulwark
RFA Sir Galahad
RFA Sir Tristram
RFA Sir Bedivere

Submarines

HMS Trafalgar
HMS Turbulent
HMS Trenchant

Destroyers
Type 42
HMS Exeter
HMS Southampton
HMS Nottingham
HMS Gloucester
HMS Cardiff

Frigates

Type 22
HMS Chatham
HMS Cumberland
Type 23
 HMS Grafton
 HMS Lancaster
 HMS Iron Duke
 HMS Marlborough
 HMS Montrose
 HMS Westminster
 HMS St Albans

Survey vessels
Coastal survey vessels
 HMS Roebuck
 HMSML Gleaner
Ocean survey vessels
 HMS Scott

 HMS Enterprise

Antarctic patrol vessel

 HMS Endurance

Patrol vessels

 HMS Tyne

 HMS Archer
 HMS Blazer
 HMS Example
 HMS Explorer
 HMS Raider
 HMS Ranger
 HMS Trumpeter
 HMS Tracker

Mine countermeasures vessels

Hunt-class MCMVs
 HMS Ledbury
 HMS Cattistock
 HMS Middleton
s
 HMS Walney
 HMS Pembroke
 HMS Grimsby
 HMS Bangor
 HMS Ramsey
 HMS Shoreham

Royal Fleet Auxiliary

RFA Argus
RFA Fort Victoria
RFA Orangeleaf
RFA Wave Ruler
MV Hurst Point

Royal Navy harbour tugs
HMT Helen
HMT Nimble
HMT Powerful
HMT Bustler
HMT Dexterous

Foreign navies

US

European navies

 

 

 

 - 
 - 
 

 

 
 - 
 - 
 

 - 
 - 
 - Versaitis
 - 
 - 
 - 
 -

African navies
 - 
 - 
 - 
 -

South American navies
 - 
 - 
 -

Commonwealth navies

Middle East and Asian navies
 

 

 - , 
 - ,

Non-navy ships

Training ships and tall ships
Bulgaria - TS Kaliakra
France - TS La Recouvrance
Ireland - TS Asgard II
Netherlands - TS Mercedes,  TS Europa
Norway - TS Sørlandet

Poland - STS Dar Młodziezy, STS Pogoria
Russia - STS Mir
US - TS Pride of Baltimore
UK
Grand Turk
Sloop Pickle, a reconstruction of HMS Pickle
TS Bessie Ellen
TS Royalist
STS Lord Nelson
SV Tenacious
TS Prince William
TS Matthew
Earl of Pembroke
Kaskelot
TS Phoenix
TS Iris
TS Will

Other
MV Balmoral, 
SS Shieldhall,
MV John Jerwood (Sea Cadet offshore training vessel),
MV Princess Caroline,
MV Sand Harrier,
Tug Challenge

By company
BP - MV British Merlin
British Antarctic Survey - RRS James Clark Ross
Cunard - Queen Elizabeth 2
HM Customs - HMCC Valiant
Global Marine Systems - CS Sovereign
Sir Donald Gosling - Yacht Leander G
Guernsey Sea Fisheries - MV Leopardess
Northern Lighthouse Board - NLV Polestar, NLV Pharos
Red Funnel - , 
RNLI - Severn class lifeboat The Duke of Kent (71-45)
Scottish Fisheries Protection Agency - FPV Norna
Silversea Cruises - MV Silver Cloud
Trinity House - THV Patricia
Wightlink - MV St Catherine, MV St Clare, MV St Faith, HSC FastCat Ryde, HSC FastCat Shanklin
Historic ships MTB 102, HMS Medusa

References

External links
Secure.trafalgar200.com
Ships and Seamen of Trafalgar 200 .

Lists of military units and formations
Trafalgar 200
Royal Navy lists
2005 in military history